Morne de la Grande Montagne is the highest point of Saint Pierre and Miquelon, an overseas collectivity of France located in the Atlantic Ocean, with an elevation of 240 metres (787 ft).  It is located near the center of Miquelon Island, which is also known as Grande Miquelon.

See also
Geography of Saint Pierre and Miquelon

External links
  Morne de la Grande Montagne, Saint Pierre and Miquelon, GeoNames.

Morne de la Grande Montagne
Miquelon-Langlade